Ivan H. Grove (August 18, 1894 – January 2, 1984) was an American football, basketball and track coach and college athlete.

College athlete
As a college athlete at the University of Tulsa (then known as the Kendall Institute), he led the nation with 196 points in 1919 Kendall Orange and Black football team as a quarterback under head coach Francis Schmidt.

College coach
Grove spent two years as the head football coach at Oklahoma Baptist University from 1920 to 1921. In 1922, he was hired by Francis Schmidt as the first full-time paid assistant coach at the University of Arkansas, where he coached for two years.

Grove was then hired as the head coach and athletic director at Hendrix College in Conway, Arkansas, where coached until he retired in 1959.

Death
In retirement, Grove lived a block from the Hendrix campus. He died on January 2, 1984.

Head coaching record

See also
 List of college football coaches with 100 losses

References

External links
 

1894 births
1984 deaths
American football quarterbacks
Arkansas Razorbacks football coaches
Basketball coaches from Colorado
Hendrix Warriors football coaches
Hendrix Warriors men's basketball coaches
Oklahoma Baptist Bison football coaches
Oklahoma Baptist Bison football players
Tulsa Golden Hurricane football players
College track and field coaches in the United States
Players of American football from Denver
Sportspeople from Denver